Benfoaka is a town in the Bogandé Department, Gnagna Province in eastern Burkina Faso. It has a population of 1,572.

References

Populated places in the Est Region (Burkina Faso)
Gnagna Province